Bert Mitchell (1922–1997) was an English footballer.

Bert Mitchell may also refer to:

Bert Mitchell, founder of accounting firm Mitchell & Titus
Bert Mitchell, former Mayor of Blenheim

See also
Albert Mitchell (disambiguation)
Robert Mitchell (disambiguation)
Herbert Mitchell (disambiguation)